Plectrude (died 718) was the consort of Pepin of Herstal, the mayor of the palace and duke of the Franks, from about 670.  She was the daughter of Hugobert, seneschal of Clovis IV, and Irmina of Oeren. She was the regent of Neustria during the minority of her grandson Theudoald from 714 until 718.

Biography

Marriage and children 
Plectrude was described as politically active and influential upon her husband and his reign. She brought a large amount of property to the Arnulfing house. Plectrude was the daughter of Hugobert, seneschal of Clovis IV, and lady Irmina of Oeren. While there is no hard evidence for the identification of Irmina as her mother, it is highly probable as both women held land which was inherited from the same source. Irmina came from one of the most powerful families in the Merovingian kingdom. After the death of Hugobert in 697, Irmina gave the monk Willibrord the land on which to build the Abbey of Echternach.Much of Pepin's wealth came from his marriage to Plectrude. During the reign of Pepin, she appears as his joint signatory in every legal instrument issued by him that is still preserved, which was unusual for this time period. She had two sons by Pepin, Drogo and Grimoald. 

Both her sons died before Pepin, Drogo died in 707 and Grimoald was murdered in 714. She ensured Pepin II's assent that Theudoald, Grimoald's son, would be his main heir. When Pepin died soon thereafter at the end of 714, she took power in Neustria as regent of the under-age Theudoald. This appointment of a child as mayor of the palace was unprecedented.

Imprisonment of Charles Martel 
To ensure her reign, she imprisoned Charles Martel, Pepin II's son with his second wife Alpaida, in Cologne. Charles is often said to have been illegitimate, but this is considered by many today an anachronistic interpretation of his status. Charles' contemporaries most likely did not consider him illegitimate, as he was born while his mother Alpaida was married to Pepin the Frank, and noblemen practiced polygamy in this period. In 715, the Neustrian nobility rebelled against her in alliance with Radbod of Friesland and defeated her in the Battle of Compiègne, which took place on September 26, 715, causing her to take refuge in Cologne. Cologne was the homeland of her family clan and where she kept Pepin's money.

In 716, Chilperic II, the king of the Franks, and Ragenfrid, the mayor of the palace, led an army into Austrasia, near Cologne, where Plectrude had gone. They defeated her and freed Charles Martel. Plectrude acknowledged Chilperic as king, gave over the Austrasian treasury, and abandoned her grandson's claim to the mayoralty. The king and his mayor then turned to besiege their other rival in the city and claimed it. The treasury shortly after received recognition by the king and mayor.

Death 
The juncture of these events favored Charles. In 717, he chased the king and the mayor to Paris before turning back to deal with Plectrude in Cologne. He then took the city and dispersed her supporters. Plectrude entered a convent, and died shortly after in the same year in Cologne, where she was buried in the monastery of St. Maria im Kapitol which she had founded. Her grandson Theudoald lived under his uncle's protection until Martel's death in 741.

Issue 

Her sons by Pepin were:

Drogo, duke of Champagne
Grimoald, mayor of the palace of Neustria

References 

718 deaths
8th-century women rulers
Year of birth unknown
8th-century Frankish nobility
8th-century Frankish women